Hayden Rolence (born ) is an American actor from Aurora, Illinois. He is best known for voicing Nemo in the 2016 animated film Finding Dory. Rolence has also acted in short films such as Cicero in Winter, Whom I Fear, and Beta Persei.

Filmography

Films

Video games

References

External links
 

American male child actors
American male voice actors
American male film actors
American male video game actors
People from Aurora, Illinois
Male actors from Illinois
21st-century American male actors
Living people
2004 births